Linda Thorson (born Linda Robinson; June 18, 1947) is a Canadian actress, known for playing Tara King in The Avengers (1968–69).

Personal life

Born in Toronto, Ontario, Canada, she attended Bishop Strachan School, and then moved to the UK in 1965 to study acting. She graduated from the Royal Academy of Dramatic Art with an Honours Diploma, including speaking and singing honours (soprano), on July 1, 1967. Her professional name is based on Bergthorson, the last name of her first husband.

She was married to the American news anchorman and producer Bill Boggs with whom she has a son; they divorced after 19 years. She was married to production designer Gavin Mitchell in November 2005, but divorced in 2011.

Thorson is bi-dialectal, speaking in her native Canadian accent when she is in North America, and received pronunciation when she is in the United Kingdom.

Career
Thorson is best known for her role as Tara King (succeeding Diana Rigg as Emma Peel) in the last series of the British TV adventure series, The Avengers, with the original star Patrick Macnee. She was reunited with Macnee in a commercial for Laurent-Perrier champagne in the mid 1970s which led to the series reappearing as The New Avengers, although Thorson did not regain her role.

Since then, she appeared in character roles in many TV series and films, including Thriller, Return of the Saint, Valentino, The Greek Tycoon, the cult horror film Curtains, Blind Justice, Alan Alda's Sweet Liberty, and Marblehead Manor.

She appeared from 1989 to 1992 in the daytime drama One Life to Live as Julia Wheaton Medina. She also appeared in Star Trek: The Next Generation, playing female Cardassian starship commander Gul Ocett in the 6th-season episode "The Chase" (1993). From 1998 to 2000, she played Isabel in the Canadian series Emily of New Moon.

In 2002, she portrayed a Supreme Court Justice in the movie Half Past Dead with Steven Seagal and Ja Rule, and appeared in the 2006 action sequel Max Havoc: Ring of Fire. Throughout 2006–07, Thorson played the villainous Rosemary King in the ITV series Emmerdale.

Thorson has performed in many dramatic and musical stage productions, including appearances on Broadway in Nell Dunn's Steaming and Michael Frayn's Noises Off!. In 1971, she starred alongside Michael Crawford and Anthony Valentine in the London West End hit show No Sex Please, We're British and later appeared as Titania in A Midsummer Night's Dream at the Open Air Theatre, Regents Park, London. She also played Hester Salomon in a UK tour of Equus opposite Simon Callow. In the summer of 2008, she appeared at the Open Air Theatre, Regent's Park in the Lerner & Loewe musical, Gigi.

In 2013, Thorson appeared onstage in Tracy Letts's play August: Osage County about a dysfunctional family in Oklahoma. In 2014, she was slated to appear in Jon Robin Baitz's play Other Desert Cities.

In 2013, Thorson produced a new stage play called The Goodbye Bird written by Colleen Murphy.

Filmography

Film

Television

References

External links
 

Audio interview at BBC Wiltshire
I, Audra: An Interview with Linda Thorson - The Terror Trap

1947 births
Actresses from Toronto
Canadian expatriate actresses in the United States
Canadian expatriates in the United Kingdom
Canadian film actresses
Canadian television actresses
Canadian stage actresses
Living people
English soap opera actresses
Alumni of RADA